Nikita Andreyevich Chistyakov (born 8 August 2000) is a Russian football player who plays for FC Novosibirsk on loan from FC Ural Yekaterinburg.

Club career
He made his debut in the Russian Professional Football League for FC Anzhi-2 Makhachkala on 11 May 2018 in a game against FC Krasnodar-2.

He made his Russian Premier League debut for FC Anzhi Makhachkala on 10 May 2019 in a game against FC Arsenal Tula, as a starter.

On 21 June 2019, he signed with FC Ural Yekaterinburg. On 4 February 2020, he was loaned to FC Chayka Peschanokopskoye.

On 19 June 2021, he joined FC Akron Tolyatti on loan for the 2021–22 season. For the 2022–23 season, Chistyakov moved on loan to FC Tyumen. On 25 January 2023, he moved on a new loan to FC Novosibirsk.

References

External links
 
 

2000 births
Footballers from Makhachkala
Living people
Russian footballers
Russia youth international footballers
Association football defenders
FC Anzhi Makhachkala players
FC Ural Yekaterinburg players
Russian Premier League players
Russian First League players
Russian Second League players
FC Akron Tolyatti players
FC Chayka Peschanokopskoye players
FC Tyumen players